The women's team épée competition in fencing at the 2016 Summer Olympics in Rio de Janeiro was held on 11 August at the Carioca Arena 3.

The medals were presented by Octavian Morariu, IOC member, Romania and Ana Derșidan-Ene-Pascu, Vice President of the FIE.

Schedule 
All times are Brasília time (UTC−3)

Draw

Finals

Classification 5–8

Final classification

References

Women's epee
2016 in women's fencing
Women's events at the 2016 Summer Olympics